Julodimorpha is a genus of beetles in the family Buprestidae, containing the following species:

Species
 Julodimorpha bakewelli (White, 1859)
 Julodimorpha saundersii Thomson, 1878

Observations on mating behaviour
In 1983, entomologists Darryl Gwynne and David Rentz reported on male Julodimorpha saundersii (confused at that time with the closely related J. bakewelli) observed attempting to copulate with discarded brown stubbies (a type of beer bottles) studded with tubercules (bobbly bits). This work won them the 2011 Ig Nobel Prize in biology. This is an example of a supernormal stimulus.

References

Buprestidae genera